Shiladitya (IAST: Śīlāditya) is the title of a 7th-century Indian king mentioned in the writings of the Chinese traveler Xuanzang (Hieun Tsang).

Xuanzang mentions him in Fascicle V of Dà Táng Xīyù Jì (Great Tang Records on the Western Regions). He is described as a prince reluctant to accept the throne. His citizens persuaded him to accept the throne, which he did. As his first act, Shiladitya gathered an army of 50,000 foot soldiers, 5,000 elephant-mounted soldiers and 20,000 cavalry to avenge the wrongful assassination of his elder brother. Over a six year campaign, he subdued the five regions of India (north, west, south, east, central), expanding his army as he won over new territories. Then, for thirty years he raised no weapons of war against anyone, and ruled in peace. He banned meat-eating in his lands, announced capital punishment for anyone killing any living creature (not such human being). He built numerous stupas along the Ganges river, many 100 feet high. He also built numerous monasteries and deva temples. On festive days, he would feed hundreds of sramanas and brahmins.

Xuanzang states in his Fascicle V that Shiladitya was of Vaishya descent, and built colossal stupas and temples dedicated to the Buddha, Surya, and Shiva.

Identification 

Shiladitya is identified with Harsha by many scholars. According to this theory, Kie-Jo-Kio-She-Kwo is Kanyakubja (Kannauj), while Po-lo-ye-kia is Prayag.

Xuanzang also mentions another king named Shiladitya, of "Mo-la-po" kingdom. One theory identifies this king as Shiladitya I of Vallabhi. In this case, his religious preference is unclear.

References

Indian royalty